Pedro Vázquez González (born 23 October 1953) is a Mexican economist and politician affiliated with the Labor Party. He served as Deputy of the LIX and LXI Legislatures of the Mexican Congress as a plurinominal representative, and previously served in the Congress of Nuevo León

References

1953 births
Living people
Politicians from Nuevo León
Mexican economists
Members of the Chamber of Deputies (Mexico)
Labor Party (Mexico) politicians
21st-century Mexican politicians
Members of the Congress of Nuevo León
Autonomous University of Nuevo León alumni
Deputies of the LXI Legislature of Mexico